The Seldovia Police Department (SPD) is a law enforcement agency which serves Seldovia, Alaska.

The agency headquarters is located at 274 Lipke Lane, and is named after Alaska's longest serving chief of police, Andy Anderson. Anderson served for over 30 years, from 1979-2011. Anderson died in 2020. Because of his popularity to the local residents, the police station was posthumously renamed "The Chief Andy Anderson Seldovia Police Station" in his honor.

Overview
The department is allocated one full-time sworn officer, who is also the Chief of Police. The officer handles cases inside Seldovia city limits.  The city has a Special Services Contract Agreement with Alaska State Troopers, which is an annual contract that must be explicitly approved each year.  With this agreement, the agency also provides limited police service to Seldovia Village and to the road system in and around the City.  When the Seldovia officer is not available, State Troopers handle calls inside the city limits.

The department has a short-term detention facility available.

Police Chiefs

See also

 List of law enforcement agencies in Alaska

References

Sources

External links
 City of Seldovia WEB site
 Interview, Seldovia Project Jukebox, Andy Anderson, Part 1
 Interview, Seldovia Project Jukebox, Andy Anderson, Part 2

Municipal police departments of Alaska